The 1953–54 Detroit Red Wings season was the Red Wings' 28th season. The highlight of season was winning the Stanley Cup.

Offseason

Regular season

Prison game
On February 2, 1954, the Red Wings played an exhibition game against Marquette Branch Prison on an outdoor ice surface.

Final standings

Record vs. opponents

Schedule and results

Player statistics

Regular season
Scoring

Goaltending

Playoffs
Scoring

Goaltending

Note: Pos = Position; GP = Games played; G = Goals; A = Assists; Pts = Points; PIM = Penalty minutes; PPG = Power-play goals; SHG = Short-handed goals; GWG = Game-winning goals
      MIN = Minutes played; W = Wins; L = Losses; T = Ties; GA = Goals-against; GAA = Goals-against average; SO = Shutouts;

Playoffs

Stanley Cup Final

Detroit wins best-of-seven series 4 games to 3

Awards and records
 Prince of Wales Trophy: || Detroit Red Wings
 Art Ross Trophy: || Gordie Howe, Detroit Red Wings
 James Norris Memorial Trophy: || Red Kelly, Detroit Red Wings
 Lady Byng Memorial Trophy: || Red Kelly, Detroit Red Wings
 Gordie Howe, Right Wing, NHL First Team All-Star
 Red Kelly, Defence, NHL First Team All-Star
 Ted Lindsay, Left Wing, NHL First Team All-Star
 Terry Sawchuk, Goaltender, NHL Second Team All-Star

References
 Red Wings on Hockey Database

Detroit
Detroit
Detroit Red Wings seasons
Stanley Cup championship seasons
Detroit Red Wings
Detroit Red Wings